Canadian plays have been written since the 19th century, both in English and in French. The present list comprises plays in English, some of which being translations from French Canadian plays. Full length and one act plays are included but not musicals.

The Playwrights Guild of Canada has a large list of titles of copyrighted plays, included in the present one, mostly their own publications or those of Playwrights Canada Press. The year of the playbook in the present list corresponds to the printed form, but when this information is unavailable, it corresponds to the first stage production. In rare cases, neither is available.

In addition to traditional forms, Canada has a vibrant non-traditional theatre scene with notable experimental, fringe, and other alternative forms, the largest fringe festival in North America being the Edmonton International Fringe Festival.

P

Pageant by Daniel Macdonald
The Painting by Sean Dixon
Palace of the end by Judith Thompson
Pals by Seymour Blicker
Panhandled by Brendan Gall
Paolilni/Pelosi, or the God in the Unknown Flesh: A Theatrical inquiry into the Murder of Filmmaker Pier Paolo Pasolini by Sky Gilbert
The Paper Bag Princess and Other Stories by Robert Munsch by Irene N. Watts
Paradise by the River by Vittorio Rossi
Paradise Express by Laurie Fyffe
Paradise Garden by Lucia Frangione
The Parallax Garden by Paddy Campbell
The Park by Geoffrey Ursell
A Particular Class of Women by Janet Feindel
The Party by Irene N. Watts
A Party to Murder by Douglas E. Hughes and Marcia Kash
Passages by Peter Cureton
Passion by Peter Anderson
The Passion by Laurie Fyffe
Passion and Sin by Hrant Alianak
Past Imperfect by Emil Sher
Patches by Irene N. Watts
The Patron Saint of Stanley Park by Hiro Kanagawa
Pauline by Pauline Carey
Pauline Johnson by Pauline Carey
Pauline the Travelling Poet by Pauline Carey
Peace and Plenty by Lib Spry
Peaches and Cream by Keith Dorland
The Pebbled Shore by Michael Shepherd
Penelope, The Impostor by Sara Barker
Perfect Pie by Judith Thompson
The Perils of Persephone by Dan Needles
The Perlious Pirate's Daughter by Anne Chislett
A Permanent Solution... by Tom Slater
Personal Convictions by Viviene Laxdal
Peter Pan by Jeff Pitcher
Philip the Second by Henry Bliss (Canadian writer)
The Photographic Moment by Mary Humphrey Baldridge
The Pied Piper by Dorothy Lees-Blakey
The Piano Teacher: A Healing Key by Dorothy Dittrich
The Pied Piper of Hamelin by Irene N. Watts
The Pied Piper Returns by Julie Salverson
Piercing by Larry Tremblay
Pig Girl by Colleen Murphy
The Pig War by Suzanne Finlay
Pink by Judith Thompson
Pinocchio by Maurice Breslow
Pinocchio by Eleanor Albanese
Pinocchio by Ernest J. Schwarz
A Place on Earth by Betty Jane Wylie
Plague of the Gorgeous by Gordon Armstrong
The Play is the Thing, Tra-La! by John Gounod Campbell
Play Memory by Joanna McClelland Glass
Play Murder by Sky Gilbert
Playing Bare by Dominic Champagne translated by Shelley Tepperman
Poinsettias by Laurent Goulet
Please... Not in the Nude! by Dorothy Lees-Blakey and Brian Blakey
Pleasure & Pain by Chantal Bilodeau
Pogey Papers by Tom MacGregor
Pogie by Chris Heide and Al Macdonald
Poor Super Man by Brad Fraser
Poor Uncle Ernie in his Covered Cage by Maureen Hunter
Poppycock by Margaret Hollingsworth
Possessions by Kevin Arthur Land
Possible Worlds by John Mighton
The Postman Rings Once by Sky Gilbert
The Power of Invention by David Demchuk
The Power of One by Eleanor Albanese
Preschool by David L. Young
Pride and Prejudice by Dorothy Lees-Blakey
Primal Broads by Jane Gilchrist
Prim and Duck, Mama and Frank by Margaret Hollingsworth
Primrose School District 109 by Ted Galay
A Princess Never Should by Lib Spry
The Prisoner of Zenda by Thom Bennett and Elizabeth Ferns
The Prisoner of Zenda by Warren Graves
PROK by Brian Drader
Prom Night of the Living Dead by Brad Fraser
The Proper Perspective by Warren Graves
A Proposal by Aviva Ravel
Pseudopod Rejects by Benj Gallander and Guy Petzall
The Psychiatrist: A Lecture on 'Bridge' by Aviva Ravel
Psychic Driving by Beverley Cooper
La P'tite Miss Easter Seals by Lina Chartrand
Public Lies by Robert Fothergill
Punch and Polly by Rick McNair
Punch Up by Kat Sandler
Puppet Play by Bo Anderson
Puppets by John Lazarus
Pusha-Man by Joseph Jomo Pierre
Pushkin by George Jonas
Put on the Spot by Beth McMaster
Put Up Your Hand! by Norm Reynolds
Pyaasa (play) by Anusree Roy

Q

Quartet for Three Actors by Rex Deverell
Queen Lear by Eugene Stickland
The Queen of Queen Street by Maureen Hunter
Queen Mill of Galt by Gary Kirkham
Queenie O'Leary by Suzanne Finlay
The Queens by Normand Chaurette translated by Linda Gaboriau
Que Pasa with la Raza, eh? by Carmen Aguirre
Quiche My What! by Vince Grittani
Quiet! I'm Talking by Vince Grittani
Quiet in the Land by Anne Chislett
A Quiet Place by Brendan Gall
Quiet Please, There's A Lady On Stage by Margaret Matulic
Quiller by Michael Cook
Quite Contrary by David Copelin

R

Radio Daze by Joao Canhoto
Raft Baby by Dennis Foon
Rag Doll by Paul Ledoux
The Rainmaker by Gwen Pharis Ringwood
The Rainstone by Irene N. Watts
Raptures by Christine Foster
A Rare Day in June by Carol Libman
Ratamacue by Jane Gilchrist
Rattle in The Dash by Peter Anderson
Rave by Kevin Arthur Land
Real Live Girl by Damien Atkins
The Real McCoy by Andrew Moodie
The Real Sleeping Beauty by Sara Barker
The Real World? by Michel Tremblay
A Reason to Live by Mark Melymick
Red by Jordan Hall
Red Emma by Carol Bolt
The Red King's Dream by David Belke
The Red Priest by Mieko Ouchi
Red Snow by Diana Tso
Redpatch by Sean Harris Oliver and Raes Calvert
Reflections by Shirley Barrie
Reflections by Tom Slater
The Refugee Hotel by Carmen Aguirre
Refugees by Harry Rintoul
Relative Strangers by Marilyn Boyle
Relative Strangers by James W. Nichol
The Reluctant Resurrection of Sherlock Holmes by David Belke
The Remaindered Mr. Verboten by Laurent Goulet
Remember Me by Michel Tremblay
Remember Me by Irene N. Watts
Resurrection by Louis Patrick Leroux translated by Shelley Tepperman and Ellen Warkentin
Return to Wonderland by Thom Bennett
Revelation by Shirley Barrie
Reverend Jonah by Paul Ciufo
Revolutions by Cherie Thiessen
Rex Morgan, M.D. by Brian Shein
The Rez Sisters by Tomson Highway
Rice Boy by Sunil Kuruvilla
Rice Rockets & Yacht People by Simon Johnston
The Riddle of the World by David French
Riders of the Apocalypse (the reunion tour) by David Belke
Riders of the Sea by Shirley Barrie
The Riel Commission by Rex Deverell and Wayne Schmaltz
Righteousness by Rex Deverell
Ring Around a Murder by Jack Sheriff
Riot by Andrew Moodie
Robena's Rose-Coloured Glasses by Beth McMaster
Robinson Crusoe by Colin Heath
Rock and Roll by John Gray
The Rock and the Hard Place by Suzanne Finlay
Role Call by Meghan Gardiner
Rosalie Sings Alone by David Demchuk
Rose by Tomson Highway
Roshni by Anusree Roy
Rough Magic by John Lazarus
Round the Bend by Alan R. Davis
Roundup by Barbara Sapergia
Rootless but Green Are the Boulevard Trees by Uma Parameswaran
Rope Enough by Sky Gilbert
Rope's End by Douglas Bowie
Rosie Learns French by Carol Bolt
Roswell by Bruce Barton
Rubber Dolly by Don Hannah
Ruby and the Rock by Viviene Laxdal
The Rum Runners of Rainbow Ravine by Geoffrey Ursell
A Runaway Couple by W.A. Tremayne
Running Dog, Paper Tiger by Simon Johnston
The Running of the Deer by Geoffrey Ursell

S

Sacred Hearts by Colleen Curran.
Sadie Flynn Comes to Big Oak by Norm Foster
Sadly as I Tie My Shoes by Sara Graefe
The Saga of the Steamer Atlantic by Simon Johnston
The Saga of Tom Three Persons by Gordon Pengilly
Saga of the Wet Hens by Jovette Marchessault translated by Linda Gaboriau
Sahel by Franco Catanzariti
Saint Frances of Hollywood by Sally Clark
Sainte-Carmen of the Main by Michel Tremblay
Sainte-Marie Among the Hurons by James W. Nichol
The Saints and the Apostles by Raymond Storey
Salaam-Shalom by Stephen Orlov
Salesmen Don't Ride Bicycles by Leo Orenstein
Salt-Water Moon by David French
Salt Water Soakin' My Sox by Paul Ledoux
Same Time, Next Year by Bernard Slade
Sam's Last Dance by Sean Dixon
Sam Slick: the Clockmaker by Paul Ledoux
Sanctuary by Emil Sher
Sand by Colleen Wagner
The Sand by Laurie Fyffe
Sapphire Butterfly Blue by Melissa Major
Sarah's Play by Rex Deverell
Saskatoon Pie! by Geoffrey Ursell
Saul by Charles Heavysege
Saving Angel by Charlotte Fielden
Say Ginger Ale by Marcia Johnson
Scary Stories by Gordon Armstrong
Scenes from My Dock! by Vince Grittani
Scenes From the 19th Hole by Vince Grittani
Scenes From The Subjective Reality by David L. Young
Schedules by Bruce McManus
The Science of Disconnection by David Belke
The School Show: The Great Huron County Teachers Strike of 1978 by Ted Johns
Schoolhouse by Leanna Brodie
Schoolyard Games by John Lazarus
Scarpone by Vittorio Rossi
Screwed, Blued and Tattooed by Simon Bradbury
The Seagull by David French
Seance by Tom Hendry
Season of the Witch by Irene N. Watts
Sea Turtle by Bo Anderson
Second Chance by Mark Melymick
Second Chance by Aviva Ravel
The Second Shepherds' Play by Betty Jane Wylie
The Secret Life of Haddon Mackenzie by Sky Gilbert
The Secret Garden by Paul Ledoux
The Secret Mask by Rick Chafe
The Secret of the Spyglass by Robert William Pendergrast
The Secret Story of Santa Claus by Tina Silver
Secrets by John Lazarus
Secrets of an Usherette by Gordon Armstrong
Security by Neil Fleming
Seeds by Annabel Soutar
See Bob Run by Daniel MacIvor
Self-Help by Norm Foster
Selfie by Christine Quintana
Selkirk Avenue by Bruce McManus
Separate Beds by MJ Cruise.
Separate Pieces: A Comedy Cabaret by Aviva Ravel
Seven Days in the Life of Simon Labrosse by Carole Fréchette
7-10 Split by Michael G Wilmot
7 Stories by Morris Panych
Severe Blow to the Head by Gil Garratt
Sex in Heaven by Gordon Armstrong
Sex Maniac by Kico Gonzalez-Risso
Sexy Laundry by Michele Riml
Shakedown Shakespeare by Philip Adams and Yvette Nolan
The Shakespeare Show: Or, How an Illiterate Son of a Glover Became the Greatest Playwright in the World by Ryan Gladstone
Shakespeare's Nigga by Joseph Jomo Pierre
Shakespeare's Dog by Rick Chafe
Shakespeare's Will by Vern Thiessen
The Shape of a Girl by Joan MacLeod
Sharnoozle by Robert Tsonos
Shatter by Trina Davies
Shea of the White Hands by Rose Scollard
Sheep by Daniel R. Lillford
Shelter by Carol Bolt
Sheherazade and the 1001 Nights by Christine Foster
She Has a Name by Andrew Kooman
She Shoots, She Scores by Alan R. Davis
The Shinbone General Store Caper by Rex Deverell
Shoebox by Margaret Matulic
Shoe Fly Blues by Rick McNair
The Sholom Aleichem Show by Aviva Ravel
The Shooting Stage by Michael MacLennan
The Short Circuit by Rex Deverell
Shortshrift by Rex Deverell
The Short Tree and the Bird that Could Not Sing by Dennis Foon
Shoulder Pads by Aviva Ravel
Shusha and the Story Snatcher by Shirley Barrie
Shylock by Mark Leiren-Young
Shylock's Treasure by Munroe Scott
Interface by Greg Nelson
Signe's Lost Colours by Eleanor Albanese
Silver Dagger by David French
A Similar Difference by Paul Ledoux
Sinners by Norm Foster
Sinners Three & The Bad and the Sick by Stewart Lemoine
Silver Bird and Scarlet Feather by Maurice Breslow
Sir Gawain the Yellow Knight by James G. Patterson
Sister Ella by Lucia Frangione
Sister Jude by Dave Carley
Sisters by Wendy Lill
Sisters by Simon Johnston
Sit Calm! by Rick McNair
The Sitter by Norm Foster
Sitting in Paradise by Eugene Stickland
Six Dry Cakes for the Hunted by George Woodcock
Six Puppet Plays by Beth McMaster
Sixty Below by Patti Flather
Sixty Below by Leonard Linklater
'67 by Robert Wallace
Skin by Dennis Foon
Skydive by Kevin Kerr
Sled by Judith Thompson
A Sleigh-Ride Christmas Carol by Peter Anderson
Sleigh Without Bells: a ghost story about the Donnellys by James Reaney
The Sleeping Beauty by Gwen Pharis Ringwood
Sleeproom by Robin Fulford
Sleep, Speak, Turn Toward... by Valerie Senyk
Sleepwalker by Kico Gonzalez-Risso
Slow Trains an' Dirty Towns by Daniel R. Lillford
Interface by Greg Nelson
Slowly, an exchange is taking place by José Teodoro
Small Time by Norm Foster
Smoked Glass Ceiling by Rita Deverell
Snake in Fridge by Brad Fraser
Snow Dance by Daniel R. Lillford
Socrates on Trial by Andrew David Irvine
Soldier's Heart by David French
So Many Doors by Celia McBride.
Some Assembly Required by Eugene Stickland
Someday by Drew Hayden Taylor
Someone Sleeps Somewhere by Don Druick
Something Dead and Evil Lurks in the Cemetery, and It's My Dad by Marty Chan
Something New by Bo Anderson
Something Wicked This Way Comes by Gyllian Raby
Sometime, Never by Norah Harding
Song of the Serpent by Betty Lambert
Sonjo & the Thundergod by Shirley Barrie
Sonny by James W. Nichol
Sonya by Norma Harrs
Soul Mate by David Belke
The Soul Menders by Patti Flather
Interfaceby Greg Nelson
Speculum by Betty Jane Wylie
Sperm Count by Stephen Orlov
Spiral Woman and the Dirty Theatre by Linda Griffiths
Interface by Greg Nelson
Split by Kico Gonzalez-Risso
Spirits of Gold by Kico Gonzalez-Risso
Sports Legend by James G. Patterson
Spot by Gordon Armstrong
Spreading It Around by Londos D'Arrigo
Squawk by Megan Gail Coles.
Sqrieux-de-Dieu by Betty Lambert
Stag and Doe by Mark Crawford
Star by C. E. Gatchalian
Star Gates by Paddy Campbell
Star Struck by Viviene Laxdal
Stargazing by Tom Cone
Starter Home by Katherine Koller
Stay by David Demchuk
Steel Kiss by Robin Fulford
Steps by Betty Jane Wylie
Step Sister, Blood Brother by Viviene Laxdal
Stick With Molasses by Beth McMaster
St. George by Ian Weir
Still the Night by Theresa Tova
The Stillborn Lover by Timothy Findley
A Stitch in Time by Dorothy Lees-Blakey and Brian Blakey
Stolen Lives by Peter Colley
The Stone Face by Sherry MacDonald
Storm und Tango by Don Druick
Storm Warning by Norm Foster
The Story of a Sinking Man by Morris Panych
Straight Stitching by Shirley Barrie
The Strange Wet Saga of the Disappearing Ballerina by Gil Garratt
Street Safe by Anna Fuerstenberg
Stripes For Christmas by Beth McMaster
St. Sam and the Nukes: Co-generation at the Bruce by Ted Johns
Studies in Motion by Kevin Kerr
Suburban Motel by George F. Walker
Sucker Falls by Drew Hayden Taylor
Suddenly Shakespeare by Kim Selody
The Summer of the Piping Plover by Catherine Banks
Summit Conference by John Gounod Campbell
Sunday Dinner by Diane Grant
Sungold by Irene N. Watts
The Sun Runner by Kenneth Dyba
Sunspots by Dennis Foon
Surface Tension by Elyne Quan
Surprise, Surprise by Michel Tremblay
Sushi by Don Druick
Suzie Goo: Private Secretary by Sky Gilbert
Sveva by Janet Munsil
The Swapper by Rose Scollard
Sweet & Sour Pickles by Ted Galay
Sweet Land of Liberty by Sharon Pollock.
Sweet Marie by James Howard
Swahili Godot by Robin Fulford
Swimmers by Clem Martini
Swipe by Gordon Pengilly
Switching Places by Rex Deverell
Swollen Tongues by Kathleen Oliver
Sybil in the Middle by Barbara Novak

T

Tagged by Chantal Bilodeau
Belle by Florence Gibson MacDonald
Take d Milk, Nah? by Jivesh Parasram 
Take Me Where the Water's Warm by James DeFelice
Taking Liberties by Dave Carley
Taking Steam by Kenneth Klonsky and Brian Shein
Tales From the Arabian Nights by Simon Johnston
Tales From Tolstoy by Irene N. Watts
Talk by Michael Nathanson
Talking Bodies by Larry Tremblay
The Talking Fish by Irene N. Watts
Tamara by John Krizanc
The Taming of the Tamer by Patrick Young
The Taming of the Wild Things by Irene N. Watts
Tango Noir by Rose Scollard
Tangleflags by Carol Bolt
Tantrums by Hrant Alianak
Tecumseh by Charles Mair
Tempting Providence-scene by Robert Chafe
Ten Ruminations on an Elegy Attributed to William Shakespeare by Sky Gilbert
$38,000 for a Friendly Face by Kristin Shepherd
Ten Times Two by David Belke
Ten Ways to Abuse an Old Woman by Sally Clark
Terror and Erebus by Gwendolyn MacEwen
Test Drive by Dave Carley
Texas Boy by George Rideout
Thanks for giving by Kevin Loring
That Darn Plot by David Belke
That Elusive Spark by Janet Munsil
That Summer by David French
Theatrelife by Sky Gilbert
Then and Now by Anne Chislett
There's a Ghost in my Opera House by Jack Sheriff
Therese’s Creed by Michael Cook
These Girls by Viviene Laxdal
They Don't Call Them Farmers Anymore by Gordon Pengilly
Thieves in the Night by David Demchuk
Thin Ice by Beverley Cooper
The Third Life of Eddie Mann by John Spurway
13th God by Rose Scollard
Thirteen Hands by Carol Shields
The Thirteenth One by Denyse Gervais Regan
This Great City by Paul Dunn
This Is How We Got Here by Keith Barker
This is a Play by Daniel MacIvor
This Pet's Allowed by Irene N. Watts
This Year, Next Year by Norah Harding
Three Questions by Gordon Armstrong
Three Scenes in a Gazebo by Tom MacGregor
Three Storey, Ocean View by Catherine Banks
Three Strikes, You're Dead by George Rideout
Through the Eyes by Don Druick
Thumbelina by Julie Salverson
Thy Kingdom Come by Daniel R. Lillford
Ticks by C. E. Gatchalian
Tiger of Malaya by Hiro Kanagawa
Tiln by Michael Cook
Time Bomb by Betty Jane Wylie
TITANIC: The Untold Story by Anthony Sherwood
2 B WUT U R by Morris Panych
Today I'll Be Fine by Carol Libman
To Far Away Places by Rick McNair
Together Forever by Harry Rintoul
To Grandmother's House We Go by Joanna McClelland Glass
Tom Form and the Speed of Love by Gordon Pengilly
Too Many Cooks by Douglas E. Hughes and Marcia Kash
Too Many Kings by Paddy Campbell
Tornado by Judith Thompson
Toronto at Dreamer's Rock by Drew Hayden Taylor
Toronto, Mississippi by Joan MacLeod
Toronto the Good by Andrew Moodie
Tough! by George F. Walker
Tideline by Wadji Mouawad
To be Frank by Brian Drader
Tokyoland by Don Druick
The Tomorrow Box by Anne Chislett
Tomorrow Will be Better by Irene N. Watts
To Ride in Triumph by Douglas Abel
Touch by David Demchuk
The Tourist by José Teodoro
Trading Injuries by Rahul Varma
Trauma by Hope McIntyre
Treasure Island by Ernest J. Schwarz
Treasure Island by Michael Shepherd
The Trial of Judith K. by Sally Clark
Trial of a Ladies Man by Sally Clark
The Trials of Eddy Haymour by John Lazarus
The Trials of Ezra Pound by Timothy Findley
The Trigger by Carmen Aguirre
The Trouble with Richard by L. E. Hines
Tripping Through Time by Shirley Barrie
True Love Lies by Brad Fraser
True North by Keith Dorland
Trummi Kaput by Dennis Foon
Trying by Joanna McClelland Glass
Tsymbaly by Ted Galay
Tuna Fish Eulogy by Lindsay Price
Turnaround by Clem Martini
Turns by Kevin Arthur Land
TV Lounge by Carol Bolt
Twenty-One Days by Rachel Wyatt
Twice Six Plus One by Beth McMaster
Twisted by Charlotte Corbeil-Coleman and Joseph Jomo Pierre
The Twisted Loaf by Aviva Ravel
Two Beers for Three People by David L. Young
Two Brothers: A Parable of Free Trade by Ted Johns
Two for the Pot by Ed Schroeter
2000 by Joan MacLeod
The Two Rooms of Grace by Eleanor Albanese
Two Words For Snow by Richard Sanger
Two Ships Passing by Dave Carley
2-2 Tango by Daniel MacIvor

U

UBU The Barbarian by Paul Ledoux
The Ugly Duchess by Janet Munsil
The Ugly Man by Brad Fraser
Ultravista by Gordon Armstrong
Under the Graywacke: Voices of Northern Ontario by Ted Johns
Under the Skin by Betty Lambert
The Underground Lake by Rex Deverell
Under Coyote's Eye by Henry Beissel
The Understudy by Daniel R. Lillford
Under the Big Top by Jan Derbyshire
Under the Moon with Aunt Birdie by Eleanor Albanese
Underwater, Overseas by Emil Sher
Undressing The Nation by Kico Gonzalez-Risso
Unholy Trinity by Maxim Mazumdar
Unicorn Horns by Melissa Major
Unidentified Human Remains and the True Nature of Love by Brad Fraser
Union Maid by Aviva Ravel
Unity, 1918 by Kevin Kerr
The Unnatural and Accidental Women by Marie Clements
The Unspecific Scandal by William Henry Fuller
The Up-hill Revival by Rex Deverell
Up Island by David King
Up on the Roof by Clem Martini
Up the Garden Path by Lisa Codrington
Urban Nun by Dave Carley

V

Vengeance by Aviva Ravel
The Ventriloquist by Leanna Brodie
Venus Sucked In: A Post-Feminist Comedy
Veranda by Betty Jane Wylie
Veronia by Daniel Libman
Vesalius and Servetus by Robert Lalonde
The Vic by Leanna Brodie
Vicious Little Boyz in the Rain by Gil Garratt
Video by Yvette Nolan
Vigil by Morris Panych
The Vile Governess by Stewart Lemoine
Village of Idiots by John Lazarus
Vinci by Maureen Hunter
The Violinist and the Flower Girl by Hrant Alianak
Viridias by Muriel Hogue
A Visit to Cal's Mother by Edwin Procunier
Visions of Prostitutes by David L. Young
The Voice of the People by Robertson Davies
Voodoo by Kico Gonzalez-Risso

W

Waiting for Gaudreault by André Simard translated by Henry Beissel
Waiting for the Parade by John Murrell
Wake Me When It's Over by Vince Grittani
Walk Right Up by Celia McBride
Walking on the Moon by George Rideout
Walking on Water by Dave Carley
Wallflower by Aviva Ravel
The Walls of Africa by Hrant Alianak
Walsh by Sharon Pollock
Wanda T. Grimsby: Detective Extraordinaire by Melissa Major
Wanted by Sally Clark
War by Dennis Foon
War Babies by Margaret Hollingsworth
Warm Wind in China by Kent Stetson
Warriors by Michel Garneau
The Washing Machine by Radha S. Menon
Wasps by Sally Clark
Was She Sown or Was She Reaped by John Gounod Campbell
Watchin' by Mark Leiren-Young
Waxworks by Trina Davies
We Are So Different Now by Shauna Singh Baldwin
Wedding Whine by Vince Grittani
We Happy Few by Mark Blagrave
Weird Kid by Rex Deverell
Welfarewell by Cat Delaney
West Edmonton Mall by Patti Flather
The West Show by Paul Thompson
Western by Hrant Alianak
West of the 3rd Meridian by Trina Davies
Westray by Chris O'Neill and Ken Schwatrz
Whale Riding Weather by Bryden MacDonald
What A Cad! by Celia McBride
What a Young Wife Ought to Know by Hannah Moscovitch
Whatever Makes You Happy by Aviva Ravel
What if...? by Shirley Barrie
What Lies Before Us by Morris Panych
What the Ear Hears Last by Penn Kemp
When George the Third Was King by Catharine Nina Merritt
When Everybody Cares by Beth McMaster
When Girls Collide by Stewart Lemoine
When The Reaper Calls by Peter Colley
When the World Was Young by Maurice Breslow
When We Were Singing by Dorothy Dittrich
Where is Kabuki? by Don Druick
Whereverville by Josh Macdonald
Where the Blood Mixes by Kevin Loring
Where the River Meets the Sea by Patti Flather
Whereville by Josh MacDonald
While We're Young by Don Hannah
Whiskey Six Cadenza by Sharon Pollock
White Biting Dog by Judith Thompson
White Sand by Judith Thompson
Whole Lotto Love by Kevin Arthur Land
The Whore's Revenge by Sky Gilbert
Who Has Seen the Wind by Lee MacDougall
Who Killed Killed Spalding Gray? by Daniel MacIvor
Who's Looking After the Atlantic? by Warren Graves
Who's Pauline by Cherie Thiessen
Who's Under Where? by Douglas E. Hughes and Marcia Kash
Widger's Way by Gwen Pharis Ringwood
Wilbur County Blues by Andrew Moodie
Wild Abandon by Daniel MacIvor
Wildcat by Simon Johnston
Wild Grapes by Richard Sanger
William & James by Robert Tsonos
Willie and the Watchers by Cherie Thiessen
The Windigo by Tom MacGregor
Why We Tortured Him by Sky Gilbert
Wide Awake Hearts by Brendan Gall
Wild Mouth by Maureen Hunter
William the Bard by David Belke
Will the Real J.T. LeRoy Please Stand Up? by Sky Gilbert
The Wind in the Willows by Michael Shamata
The Windigo by Dennis Foon
Wintersong by Carol Libman
Windfall by Norm Foster
Winnie by Patrick Young
Wireless by Gil Garratt
Willful Acts by Margaret Hollingsworth
Wings of Resistance by Eleanor Albanese
Witchcraft by Kico Gonzalez-Risso
The Witch of Endor by Robert Norwood
Witches & Bitches by Patrick Young
With Bated Breath by Bryden MacDonald
With Love and a Major Organ by Julia Lederer
Who Cares? by Eleanor Albanese
Wobbling Madonna by Lucia Frangione
Wolfboy by Brad Fraser
The Woman Who Touted Her Prize by Hilary R. Burke
Women in the Attic by Len Peterson
Wonderville by Kico Gonzalez-Risso
The World We Live On Turns So That the Sun Appears to Rise by David Demchuk
World of Wonders by Elliott Hayes
Would You Like a Cup of Tea? by Warren Graves
The Work of Art by Victoria Dawe
Wreck of the National Line by Sharon Pollock.
Wreckage by Sally Stubbs
Writing With Our Feet by Dave Carley
Written on Water by Michel Marc Bouchard
Wrong For Each Other by Norm Foster
Wu-Feng by Munroe Scott

Y

Yankee Notions by Anne Chislett
A Yard of Pucks by James DeFelice
Yellow on Thursdays by Sara Graefe
Yesterday the Children were Dancing by Gratien Gélinas
Yesteryear by Joanna McClelland Glass
Yodellers by Michael Healey and Kate Lynch
You Are Here by Daniel MacIvor
You Can't See Africa From Sicily by Heldor Schäfer
You Fancy Yourself by Maja Ardal
Young King Arthur by Clive Endersby
You'll Get Used To It! - The War Show by Peter Colley
You're a What?! by Margaret Matulic
You're Him by John Lazarus
Your Late Mama by Dorothy Lees-Blakey and Brian Blakey
Yours 'Til The Moon Falls Down by Gordon Pengilly
You Smell Good To Me by Tom Hendry
You Want Me to be Grown-up, Don't I? by Rex Deverell
Yuppie Ciao by Yuppie Ciao
Yuppies! The Musical by Vince Grittani

Z

Zac and Speth by Rick Chafe
Zaydok by Dennis Foon
Zak and the Magic Blue Stone by Eleanor Albanese
Zone by Aviva Ravel

See also
 List of Canadian playwrights
 Theatre of Canada
 Canadian Stage production history

References

External links
 Playwrights Guild of Canada list of 2,000 Canadian plays

Lists of plays

Canadian literature-related lists